Thornton is a southern suburb of Cape Town, South Africa. Like Pinelands, Thornton is a mainly residential suburb with an abundance of trees. It is bordered by the Elsieskraal River, Pinelands, Viking Way, and the M7 Jakes Gerwel Drive. Many of the streets in Thornton are named after Viking themes, such as Thor Circle, Odin Drive and Viking Way. Others are named after trees, such as Poplar Avenue and Sipres Avenue.

Demographics
According to the 2011 Census, Thornton has a population of 5,862 people, with 94% of the labour force (aged 15 to 64) being employed. The predominant language spoken in Thornton is English.

Geography 
Thornton, like Pinelands, is in the Southern Suburbs of Cape Town, sitting close to the border delineating the Northern and Southern Suburbs. There are many trees lining the roads of Thornton, and there are green spaces with wild flowers.

Education 
The College of Cape Town has a Thornton Campus, primarily for Civil Engineering and Mechanical Engineering.

There is also the Thornton Primary School, which was founded in 1954. Thornton Primary School caters for grade 1 to grade 7. In 1966 the school hall was built.

The SOS Children's Village of Cape Town was established in Thornton in 1994. The SOS in Thornton has facilities for approximately 100 orphaned or abandoned children.

Sports
The Santos Sports Fields are in Thornton. There are also children's play parks within Thornton, which have swings and slides for children.

Amenities
There are two shopping centres in Thornton, including two convenience stores and shops such as a locksmith, barber, food shops, a pet shop and an electronics store.

There are also churches in Thornton, including the N.G. Kerk Thornton and Grace Church. The Clothing Bank is in Thornton and was founded in 2010, working primarily with unemployed mothers.

References

Suburbs of Cape Town